The Supercopa Paraguay (Paraguay Supercup) is an annual one-match football official competition in Paraguay organised by the Paraguayan Football Association (APF) which is played by the Primera División champions with the best record in the season's aggregate table and the Copa Paraguay champions, starting from 2021. This competition, created in October 2019, serves as the season's closing event and is scheduled to be played in December each year, one week after the end of the league season.

The competition was originally scheduled to be played for the first time in 2020, but its implementation had to be postponed to 2021 due to the COVID-19 pandemic and the cancellation of that year's Copa Paraguay.

Participating clubs

The Supercopa Paraguay is played between:
 The Copa Paraguay champions
 The best-ranked Primera División champions in the season's aggregate table

In the event the same club wins the Copa Paraguay and also ends the season as the best-ranked league champion, its rival in the Supercopa will be the champion of the remaining league tournament (Apertura or Clausura).

Competition format
One 90-minute game at a neutral venue (Estadio Defensores del Chaco)
If tied, the winner is decided in a penalty shootout

Finals

Performance by club

References

External links
 Supercopa Paraguay on the Paraguayan Football Association's website

Football competitions in Paraguay
Paraguay